Provocative is the fourth album by American R&B recording artist Johnny Gill. It was his second album for Motown Records and fourth album overall.

Three singles were released from the album with music videos. The first single, "The Floor", was accompanied by a music video directed by Julien Temple. Temple previously directed the music video "Fairweather Friend" from Gill's previous album. The second single "I Got You" was directed by Sanji. The video for the third single "Long Way From Home" was directed by Wayne Isham.

Provocative was certified Gold by the RIAA on August 11, 1993. The most successful single from the album was "The Floor", which peaked at number six in Australia, reached number 56 on the US Billboard Hot 100, and charted within the top 50 in the Netherlands and New Zealand.

Track listing

Notes
 signifies a co-producer
"I Got You" contains a drum sample of "Synthetic Substitution", written by Herb Rooney, and performed by Melvin Bliss.
"A Cute, Sweet, Love Addiction" contains an element of "Turn Back the Hands of Time", written by Jack Daniels and Bonnie Thompson, and performed by Tyrone Davis.

Personnel
Credits adapted from liner notes, Discogs and Allmusic.

Jimmy Jam, Babyface, Nathan Morris, Daryl Simmons, McKinley Horton - keyboards
Jimmy Jam, L.A. Reid, Nathan Morris, Daryl Simmons - drum programming
Stokley Williams - drums
Kayo, Johnny Crooms - bass
Terry Lewis, Stokley Williams - percussion
Billy Steele - piano
Karyn White, Lisa Keith, Mint Condition, Babyface, Marc Nelson, Alexandra Brown, Jamecia Bennett, Pamela Copeland, Nycolia "Tye-V" Turman, Nathan Morris, Shawn Stockman, Wanya Morris - backing vocals
Technical
 Recording engineer: Steve Hodge, Dave Rideau, Jim Zumpano, Donnell Sullivan, Brad Gilderman, Thom Kidd, Phil Tan
 Mixing: Steve Hodge, Dave Rideau, Barney Perkins, Dave Way
 Mastering: Bernie Grundman Mastering
 Photography: Pamela Springsteen
 Art Direction: Jonathan Clark
 Design: Emilie Burnham

References

Johnny Gill albums
1993 albums
Motown albums
Albums produced by L.A. Reid
Albums produced by Babyface (musician)